

In marine and reef aquariums, a calcium reactor creates a balance of alkalinity. An acidic solution is produced by injecting carbon dioxide into a chamber with salt water and calcium rich media. The carbon dioxide lowers the pH by producing a solution high in carbonic acid, and dissolves calcium. The effluent is returned to the reef aquarium where the calcium is consumed by organisms, primarily corals when building skeletons. A calcium reactor is an efficient method to supply calcium to a reef aquarium. Reactors may be used in elaborate freshwater and brackish aquariums where freshwater clams and other invertebrates need a constant supply of calcium.

The reactor dissolves the calcium-laden media to provide bicarbonates HCO3− (alkalinity) and calcium (Ca++) ions at the same rate as consumed during calcification. Effectively dissolving the media requires an acidic pH. Saltwater may have a pH of 7.8 or higher, so to reduce the pH carbon dioxide (CO2) is used. The reaction formula is: 

 CaCO3 + H2O + CO2 ⟷ Ca2+ + 2 HCO3−

Inside the reaction chamber, a calcium rich media (aragonite), mainly CaCO3, is forced into contact with water injected with carbon dioxide (CO2) in order to create carbonic acid (H2CO3). This increases the solubility of the calcium carbonate. The reaction frees the calcium and carbonate, supplying the aquarium with water rich in Ca2+ and CO32−, important for maintaining alkalinity and calcium levels.

The bubble counter measures carbon dioxide. The flow rate of carbon dioxide is monitored so that the dissolved gas goes into the solution, with a minimum unconsumed. A needle valve or solenoid valve regulates the CO2 bubble rate. Valves with precise adjustment abilities improve bubble control.

The feed pump controls the volume of water exchange. This is important because a high rate of water flow into the reactor reduces its efficiency, thus resulting in underproduction and a waste of CO2.

Some reactors siphon water into the input of the reactor's re-circulation pump. A potential complication is the medium in the reactor becoming compacted, increasing back pressure onto the pump and reducing water into the reactor. Placing a gate or needle valve on the reactor's outlet side will improve flow characteristics compared to control from the inlet side.

Peristaltic pumps are effective operating against pressure, capable of supplying an adjustable and continuous flow over flow rates with minimal maintenance.

The pH control is connected to a probe in the reactor and adjusts the rate at which the calcium media dissolves. This probe monitors the pH level in the calcium reactor. The pH range for the typical calcium reactor is 6.5–6.8. When the pH rises above a certain level, a valve opens, allowing carbon dioxide to enter the reactor. The control closes the valve as the pH falls below this level.

Some pH controllers have an interface for an air pump. This air pump is connected to an airstone in the sump or main tank. If the probe detects a low pH level, the pump activates. The bubbles raise the pH by dissipating the CO2 gas.

See also
 Aquarium
 Protein skimmer
 Filter

References
Reefkeeping.com article on calcium reactors
Georgia Tech information on calcium reactor

Fishkeeping
Aquariums